Arthur Charles Hind (22 December 1904 – 20 November 1991) was an Indian field hockey player who competed in the 1932 Summer Olympics. He was born in Delhi.

In 1932 he was a member of the Indian field hockey team, which won the gold medal. He played as goalkeeper against Japan. India won 11-1, the goal by Inohara was the first conceded by India who had won the gold in the 1928 Olympics without conceding a goal.

References

External links
 

1904 births
1991 deaths
Field hockey players from Delhi
Olympic field hockey players of India
Field hockey players at the 1932 Summer Olympics
Indian male field hockey players
Anglo-Indian people
Olympic gold medalists for India
Olympic medalists in field hockey
Medalists at the 1932 Summer Olympics
Indian emigrants to Australia
Australian people of Anglo-Indian descent